Daphnella omaleyi is a species of sea snail, a marine gastropod mollusk in the family Raphitomidae.

Description
The length of the shell attains 10 mm, its diameter 3 mm.

A very delicate flesh-coloured shining shell with oblong aperture and produced siphonal canal. This attenuate-fusiform shell contains 7 whorls, including two decussated and alveolate apical whorls. They are much impressed at the sutures, longitudinally few-ribbed, there are but seven on the body whorl, and spirally obscurely lirate. The outer lip and the base of the siphonal canal are tinged with brown. The columella is upright.

Distribution
This marine species occurs in the Gulf of Oman.

References

External links
 

omaleyi
Gastropods described in 1899